Grupo Record is the third largest media company in Brazil, the company owns several television stations as the RecordTV and Record News, was founded in November 1989 and belongs to the businessman and bishop Edir Macedo.

Companies

Television 
RecordTV
RecordTV Internacional
Record News
Rede Família

Radio 
Rádio Record
Rádio Guaíba
Rádio Sociedade
Rádio Contemporânea
Rádio Capital
Rádio Record Campos
Rádio Record Europa

Newspaper 
Correio do Povo
Hoje em Dia
O Dia

Internet 
 (also known as R7.com and Portal R7)

Other Companies 
 Banco Renner
 Record Entrentenimento
 Record Produções e Gravações
 Line Records
 New Music

References

 
Mass media companies of Brazil
Mass media companies established in 1989
Newspaper companies of Brazil
Mass media companies based in São Paulo